Michael Alfred Rufus Isaacs, 3rd Marquess of Reading (8 March 1916 – 2 July 1980) was an English aristocrat and banker.

Biography

Early life
He was born in 1916. His father was Gerald Rufus Isaacs, 2nd Marquess of Reading (1889–1960), and his paternal grandfather was Rufus Isaacs, 1st Marquess of Reading (1860–1935). His mother was Eva Violet Mond (1895–1973), daughter of Alfred Mond, 1st Baron Melchett (1868–1930) and Violet Mond, Baroness Melchett (1867–1945). Eva Violet Mond's grandfather Ludwig Mond (1839–1909), chemist and industrialist,  created the Mond process to extract and purify nickel.

He became the 3rd Marquess of Reading after his father's death in 1960.

Career
He was a member of the London Stock Exchange.

Personal life
He was married to Margot Irene (née Duke). They had a son, Simon Rufus Isaacs, 4th Marquess of Reading (born 1942), and a daughter, Lady Jacqueline Rosemary Margaret Rufus Isaacs, who married Sir Mark Wilfrid Home Thomson, 3rd Baronet (born 1939).

He died in 1980, and Lady Reading lived until 2015.

References

1916 births
1980 deaths
English Jews
English people of Portuguese-Jewish descent
English people of German-Jewish descent
3
English bankers
20th-century English businesspeople